Hirohito (1901–1989) posthumously Emperor Shōwa of Japan; reigned 1926 to 1989.

Hirohito may also refer to:
 Hirohito Furui (b. 1967), a Japanese keyboardist, music arranger, and musician
 Hirohito Gotō (born 1969), Japanese director, playwright, and actor
 Hirohito Ōta (born 1970), Japanese freelance writer
 Hirohito Nakamura (born 1974), Japanese footballer

See also
 Emperor Fushimi (1265–1317), Japanese emperor from 1287 to 1298; personal name was Hirohito